Sedrick Demon Curry (born November 23, 1976) is a former American football defensive back who played two seasons with the BC Lions of the Canadian Football League. He played college football at Texas A&M University and attended Sterling High School in Houston, Texas. Before playing for the BC Lions, he was a member of the Birmingham Thunderbolts of the XFL.

References

External links
Just Sports Stats
College Stats
NFL Draft Scout

Living people
1976 births
Players of American football from Houston
Players of Canadian football from Houston
American football defensive backs
Canadian football defensive backs
African-American players of American football
African-American players of Canadian football
Texas A&M Aggies football players
BC Lions players
Birmingham Thunderbolts players
Sportspeople from Houston
21st-century African-American sportspeople
20th-century African-American sportspeople